Sylhet City Corporation (SCC) is a self-governing organisation which governs the municipal areas of Sylhet. This civic body of Sylhet was formed according to the Sylhet City Corporation Act, 2001.

SCC government is elected by popular vote every 5 years.

Services 
The Sylhet City Corporation is responsible for administering and providing basic infrastructure to the city.
 Evict illegal installations
 Purify and supply water
 Treat and dispose of contaminated water and sewage
 Eliminate waterlogging
 Garbage removal and street cleaning
 To manage solid waste
 To arrange hospital and dispensary
 Construction and maintenance of roads
 Installation of electric street lights
 Establish car parking
 Maintenance parks and playground
 Maintenance of cemeteries and crematoriums
 Preparation of birth and death registration certificate
 Preserving the traditional place
 Disease control, immunization
 Establishment of city corporation schools and colleges

List of officeholders

Elections

Election result 2018

Election result 2013

References

 
City Corporations of Bangladesh
Sylhet